The 2015 British motorcycle Grand Prix was the twelfth round of the 2015 Grand Prix motorcycle racing season. It was held at the Silverstone Circuit in Silverstone on 30 August 2015. The MotoGP and Moto3 races were held in wet conditions, while the Moto2 race was in dry conditions with cloudy weather.

In the premier class, Marc Márquez took his sixth pole position of the season and recorded the fastest lap by a motorcycle since Silverstone was renovated, with a 2:00.234 lap time. In the race, he battled with Valentino Rossi for first place, but he crashed out of the race with 8 laps remaining. Rossi led home an all-Italian podium for his fourth victory of the season, and his first at Silverstone. Danilo Petrucci finished in second place and recorded his first MotoGP podium, while Andrea Dovizioso finished in third place. Jorge Lorenzo and Dani Pedrosa had good starting positions, but they dropped back into 4th and 5th places respectively. Both LCR Honda riders failed to complete the race; after Jack Miller collided with his teammate Cal Crutchlow, who later retired from the race after a second crash. Yonny Hernández crashed out of the race at Turn 1 of the first lap, while Stefan Bradl and Pol Espargaró also crashed out of the race before the halfway mark. Rossi extended his lead in the championship standings to 12 points from his teammate, Lorenzo.

In the smaller classes, championship leaders Johann Zarco (Moto2) and Danny Kent (Moto3) won their respective races, to extend their championship leads.

Classification

MotoGP
The race start was delayed due to weather conditions, and ultimately started at 13:25 local time.

Moto2

Moto3

Championship standings after the race (MotoGP)
Below are the standings for the top five riders and constructors after round twelve has concluded.

Riders' Championship standings

Constructors' Championship standings

Teams' Championship standings

 Note: Only the top five positions are included for all standings.

References

British
Motorcycle Grand Prix
British motorcycle Grand Prix
British motorcycle Grand Prix